John Young ( 17401781) was a captain in the Continental Navy during the American Revolutionary War, commander of the  which was lost at sea.

Background
He began his seafaring career at an early age in the colonial merchant marine and, at the start of the American Revolution, was commissioned 23rd on the list of captains in the Continental Navy. On 20 September 1776, the Continental Congress directed Young to take the sloop-of-war  to Martinique to protect American mercantile shipping in the West Indies. Collaterally, Independence was to raid British shipping whenever the opportunity arose.

On 5 July 1777, Young was ordered to Nantes, France, and subsequently arrived at Lorient with two prizes. On 17 February 1778, while in French waters, he sailed through the French Fleet, saluting that nation's government with a 13-gun salute. In return he received a nine-gun salute, one of the earliest salutes rendered by the French government to the fledgling American government. At the time, John Paul Jones was on board Independence.

Young returned to America in the spring of 1778 and successively commanded two Pennsylvania privateers, Buckskin and Impertinent, before he was given command of the sloop-of-war  - then fitting out at Philadelphia—in May 1780. Young took her to sea on 13 August 1780 and, in the course of the ship's first cruise, captured one prize before she returned to port for repairs and alterations.

Subsequent cruises were more successful, as Young commanded Saratoga on three more sweeps at sea in which he took a total of eight more prizes. Young proved himself a daring and resourceful commander. On one occasion, he took Saratoga between two British ships and captured both. Largely as a result of his dedication and emphasis on training, Saratoga compiled a distinguished, but altogether brief, record before her untimely and unexplained loss.

Saratoga set sail from Cap-Haïtien, in what is now Haiti, on 15 March 1781. After taking a prize three days later, the sloop-of-war became separated from her later that day when a strong gale swept through the area, the high winds nearly swamping the prize commanded by Midshipman Penfield. After the storm passed by, Saratoga was nowhere to be seen, having vanished without a trace.

See also
List of people who disappeared mysteriously at sea

References

 William Bell Clark, The First Saratoga, Being the Saga of John Young and His Sloop-of-War (Baton Rouge: Louisiana State University Press, 1953)

1740 births
1780s missing person cases
1781 deaths
18th-century American naval officers
American Revolutionary War deaths
American sailors
Continental Navy officers
Missing person cases in North America
Patriots in the American Revolution
People lost at sea